Lei Jiayin is a Chinese actor. He is best known for his role as Chen Junsheng in drama The First Half of My Life.

Lei ranked 62nd on Forbes China Celebrity 100 list in 2019, and 61st in 2020.

Early life
Lei Jiayin was born in Tiedong District, Anshan, Liaoning, China. He dropped out of school when he was in junior high. Later, Lei Jiayin went to Shenyang for an interview to take part in the model examination upon his mother's suggestion. While he was waiting for the interview, actor Lv Xiaohe took a fancy to him and suggested him to learn acting. In 2002, Lei Jiayin was admitted to Shanghai Theatre Academy with his results ranked second nationwide. In 2006, Lei entered the Shanghai Dramatic Arts Center.

Career

2004–2010: Beginning 
In 2004, Lei Jiayin acted in the costume comedy drama  Pretty Girls in Jianghu , which was his first time to act in the TV series, thus officially entering the entertainment industry.

In 2007, Lei starred in the family drama Lost. In the same year, he starred alongside Guo Jingfei in the wuxia comedy theater play My Own Swordsman.

In 2009, Lei made his big screen debut in the movie 1977 College Entrance Examination. Later, he starred alongside Yao Chen in the romantic comedy Days with the Air Hostess. In the same year, he starred in the workplace comedy Go Lala Go. In addition, he also co-starred with Yao Chen in the theater play Go Lala Go.

In 2010, he acted in the theater play 21 Karat directed by He Nian, and 12 Angry Men adapted from the American film of the same name. In the same year, he starred in the romance comedy Princess Single Blind Date in Mind.

2011–2015: Rising popularity 
In 2011, Lei starred in the highly popular family drama Home Temptation.
In the same year, Lei starred in the revolutionary drama Borrow Gun.
He won the most promising newcomer award of the 15th Zolin Drama Arts Awards.

In 2012, Lei starred in the action comedy Guns and Roses, which was his first leading role in a film. He won the Best Actor Award in the 11th Changchun Film Festival, and the Best New Actor in the 7th Chinese Young Generation Film Forum Awards for his performance.
In the same year, Lei acted in the family drama Mother-in-Law is Here, and
family comedy Baby.
He won the Best New Actor award af the 3rd LeTV Awards.

In 2013, Lei starred alongside Tong Liya in the urban melodrama Weaning, which was his first time using a dialect in a television series.

In 2015, Lei starred alongside Yuan Shanshan in the family drama The Nanny Man. In the same year, he starred in crime suspense film Memento Mori, where he played a lawyer.

2017–present: Breakthrough and continued success 
In 2017, Lei starred in the romance television series The First Half of My Life adapted from the original novel by Hong Kong female writer Yi Shu. The television series was a major ratings hit in China and Lei gained increased recognition with his portrayal.
He then starred in period television series White Deer Plain adapted from Chen Zhongshi's representative work of the same name.
Lei also starred alongside Deng Jiajia in modern workplace drama White Elite.

In 2018, Lei starred in the fantasy romance comedy film How Long Will I Love U, which was produced by Xu Zheng.  Lei then starred alongside Liu Ye in modern romance series Old Boy. The same year, Lei starred in the spy drama Peace Hotel as the courageous and resourceful hero Wang Dading.

In 2019, Lei starred alongside Tang Wei in the film The Whistleblower. Lei also starred alongside Jackson Yee in the historical mystery web series The Longest Day in Chang'an, which was adapted from Ma Boyong's novel of the same name.

From 2019, Lei has been a permanent cast member on Chinese variety game show Go Fighting!

Lei starred alongside Yang Mi in the fantasy suspense film Assassin in Red which was directed by Lu Yang. The film is set to be released in 2020.

Personal life
In 2010, Lei Jiayin married his classmate Zhai Xufei and they have a daughter named Lei Xiaobei.

Filmography

Film

Television series

Variety shows

Awards and nominations

References

Living people
Male actors from Liaoning
People from Anshan
Shanghai Theatre Academy alumni
21st-century Chinese male actors
Chinese male film actors
Chinese male television actors
1983 births